The 2019 Indian general elections were held in India between 29 April to 19 May 2019 to constitute the 17th Lok Sabha.

Results

Assembly segments wise lead of parties

Candidates

Opinion polling

References

Indian general elections in Jharkhand
2010s in Jharkhand
2019 Indian general election by state or union territory